The 1978 European Tour was a series of golf tournaments that comprised the Professional Golfers' Association (PGA) European Tournament Players’ Division circuit. It is officially recognised as the seventh season of the PGA European Tour.

Historically, the PGA's Order of Merit only included tournaments in Great Britain and Ireland, but in 1970 events in continental Europe were included for the first time. The circuit and organisation evolved further over the following years, with the title of the circuit being changed to PGA European Golf Tour in 1979.

The season was made up of 21 tournaments counting for the Order of Merit, and some non-counting tournaments that later became known as "Approved Special Events". The schedule included the major national opens around Europe, with the other tournaments mostly held in England, Wales and Scotland.

The Order of Merit was won by Spain's Seve Ballesteros.

Changes for 1978
There were several changes from the previous season, with the addition of the Belgian Open, the B.A./Avis Open in Jersey, and the European Open Championship; the return of the Sumrie Better-Ball; and the loss of the Uniroyal International Championship, the Callers of Newcastle, and the Double Diamond team and individual events. In addition, the Kerrygold International was omitted from the schedule in 1978 due to the World Cup being held at Waterville. The Lancome Trophy, which clashed with the new European Open, was also missing.

Schedule
The following table lists official events during the 1978 season.

Unofficial events
The following events were sanctioned by the European Tour, but did not carry official money, nor were wins official.

Order of Merit
The Order of Merit was based on prize money won during the season, calculated using a points-based system.

Awards

See also
List of golfers with most European Tour wins

Notes

References

External links
1978 season results on the PGA European Tour website
1978 Order of Merit on the PGA European Tour website

European Tour seasons
European Tour